In statistics, the Davis distributions are a family of continuous probability distributions. It is named after Harold T. Davis (1892–1974), who in 1941 proposed this distribution to model income sizes. (The Theory of Econometrics and Analysis of Economic Time Series). It is a generalization of the Planck's law of radiation from statistical physics.

Definition
The probability density function of the Davis distribution is given by
 
Here μ, b, and n are parameters of the distribution, and n need not be an integer.

Background
In an attempt to derive an expression that would represent not merely the upper tail of the distribution of income, Davis required an appropriate model with the following properties

  for some 
 A modal income exists
 For large x, the density behaves like a Pareto distribution:

Related distributions
 If  then (Planck's law)

Notes

References
 
Davis, H. T. (1941). The Analysis of Economic Time Series. The Principia Press, Bloomington, Indiana Download book
Victoria-Feser, Maria-Pia. (1993) Robust methods for personal income distribution models. Thèse de doctorat : Univ. Genève, 1993, no. SES 384 (p. 178)

Continuous distributions